

Season 
In the summer of 1993, Inter acquired Dutch men Dennis Bergkamp and Wim Jonk, already spotted in the previous winter. Gianluca Festa, Massimo Paganin and Francesco Dell'Anno signed for Inter, too.

Inter recorded better results in the UEFA Cup than in Serie A. Rubén Sosa was - once again - vital for the club, scoring 16 goals including a hat-trick in the win over Parma (3–2). When the league stopped for Christmas holidays, the gap from Milan was still recoverable: 20 points to 24. However, in early February, after a 1–2 loss against Lazio the club sacked Osvaldo Bagnoli replacing him with Giampiero Marini. The former midfielder managed to reach the UEFA Cup final, defeating - between March and April - Borussia Dortmund and Cagliari. Inter won the first leg, beating - with a goal from Berti - Austrian club Casino Salzburg. Inter finished the league with only 31 points, just avoiding relegation: 13th place was the worst result for Inter in modern Serie A. However, Inter was successful in Europe, winning the UEFA Cup after a 1–0 win in the second leg: Jonk was the only scorer.

Overview

Squad

Goalkeepers
  Walter Zenga
  Beniamino Abate
  Raffaele Nuzzo

Defenders
  Giuseppe Bergomi
  Sergio Battistini
  Riccardo Ferri
  Paolo Tramezzani
  Gianluca Festa
  Massimo Paganin
  Antonio Paganin

Midfielders
  Francesco Dell'Anno
  Wim Jonk
  Angelo Orlando
  Alessandro Bianchi
  Nicola Berti
  Antonio Manicone
  Davide Fontolan
  Igor Shalimov

Attackers
  Dennis Bergkamp
  Darko Pančev
  Rubén Sosa
  Massimo Marazzina
  Salvatore Schillaci

Competitions

Serie A

League table

Matches

Coppa Italia 

Round of 32

Eightfinals

Quarterfinals

UEFA Cup

Round of 32

Round of 16

Eightfinals

Quarterfinals

Semifinals

Final

Appearances and goals
Statistics are referred to domestic league.

Statistics

Goals

References

Sources
  RSSSF - Italy 1993/94

Inter Milan seasons
Internazionale
UEFA Europa League-winning seasons